Delhi–Amritsar–Katra Expressway is an approved  long, 4-lane (expandable to 8 lanes) wide controlled-access expressway, which will connect Bahadurgarh border near Delhi with Katra in Jammu and Kashmir via Haryana and Punjab. It will have a spur section which will connect Nakodar with Sri Guru Ram Dass Jee International Airport located in Raja Sansi, Amritsar.

It will have a trauma centre, ambulances, fire brigades, traffic police, bus bays, truck stops, interchanges with refreshment, and recreational facilities. To be constructed as a part of the Bharatmala Pariyojana, it is expected to cost ₹35,000 crores. Detailed Project Report (DPR) was completed in November 2019, and land acquisition commenced from January 2020. M/S Feedback Infra Pvt Ltd. was appointed as DPR consultant to carry out alignment studies which submitted the final shortest proposed alignment report of Delhi–Nakodar–Gurdaspur section in September 2019, Nakodar–Amritsar section in June 2020, and the survey is currently under progress in Jammu section.

Project details
It is a combination of greenfield and which brownfield expressway which passes through Haryana, Punjab, and Jammu and Kashmir. It starts from Kundli Manesar Palwal (KMP) Expressway near Nilothi village in Jhajjar District. It will lessen the workload of Grand Trunk Road. The Ministry of Road Transport and Highways of the NDA government planned to construct 10 expressways in the country under Bharatmala Pariyojana, one of which would connect the national capital Delhi with Katra and Amritsar via Kharkhoda, Jind, Sangrur, Malerkotla,
Ludhiana, Jalandhar, Gurdaspur.

The Greenfield expressway splits into two near Nakodar. One greenfield section towards Amritsar would pass nearby Sultanpur Lodhi, Goindwal Sahib, Khadoor Sahib, TarnTarn and ends near Sri Guru Ram Dass Jee International Airport. The second section goes straight to Katra, bypassing Kathua and Jammu, and it consists of both greenfield and brownfield parts. Central and state governments also agreed to connect Dera Baba Nanak and Kartarpur Corridor with this expressway project. Nearly 14,000 acres of the land of Punjab and 5,000 acres of Haryana will be acquired for the construction of this expressway.

Construction
The NHAI has divided the construction work of Delhi–Amritsar–Katra Expressway into 2 Phases with a total of 20 construction packages.

Phase 1
Package 8 to 12 has been awarded to the Joint Venture (JV) of Evrascon and MKC Infrastructure Limited (MKCIL).

Nakodar–Amritsar spur
Nakodar–Amritsar section will merge with Delhi–Nakodar–Gurdaspur section on Package-9 (Mullanpur Dakha–Kang Sahbu).

Phase 2
 Gurdaspur–Katra section

Route alignment

Delhi to Nakodar (Main route) 
The Phase-1 of Delhi–Amritsar–Katra Expressway consists of two sections, namely Delhi–Nakodar–Gurdaspur (NE-5) and Nakodar–Amritsar (NE-5A). The Phase-2 consists of Gurdaspur–Katra section. Following is the alignment agreed by the Governments of Haryana, Punjab, and Jammu and Kashmir with the NHAI.

Haryana
Alignment is from  Nilothi-Kharkhoda-Gohana(west)- Jind(east)-Safidon(west)-Ratoli(Ambala-Narnaul)-Assandh(west)-Kalayat-Kaithal(west)-Barta. There is a proposal to extend it in Delhi from nilothi to "Urban Extension Road II".

 Jhajjar District
 Western Peripheral Expressway (also called KMP Expressway), starting near village nilothi  Nilothi ]], Jhajjar.
 Rohtak District
 Hassangarh, between Sampla-Kharkhoda on NH334B.
 SH-18 Rohtak-Kharkhoda (northwest of Kharkhoda)
 Sonipat District
 Gohana city on the west side on NH-709 Rohtak-Gohana-Panipat Highway between Rohtak-Gohana.
 between Lahkan Majra and Gohana.
 SH-11 Jind-Gohana-Sonipat between Jind and Gohana.
 Jind District
 Jind city (east of),
 The interchange with SH-14 Jind-Panipat 18 km east of Jind near Pilu Khera.
 Ratoli, (west of) interchange with Trans-Haryana Expressway between Jind-Safidon.
 Alewa, 25 km northeast of Jind between Jind-Assandh on NH-709A.
 Pegan, 25 km north of Jind between Jind-Kaithal Road 
 Kaithal District
 Kalayat (west of Kaithal), between Narwana-Kaithal on NH-152.
 Barta (west of Kaithal city) on Haryana SH-8 Kaithal-Khanauri State Highway, exits Haryana state here and enters Punjab at Galoli.

Punjab
 Patiala District
 Galoli southeast of Patran, enters here on Kaithal-Khanauri Haryana SH-8.
 Patran (northeast of), between Patran-Samana on Moonak-Patran-Samana Punjab SH-10.
 Sangrur District
 Bhawanigarh, west of Sangrur between Roshanwala-Bhawanigarh on NH-7 Barnala-Sangrur-Bhawanigarh-Patiala-Chandigarh.
 between Dhuri-Nabha.
 between Dhuri-Bagrian
 between Dhuri-Amargarh
 Malerkotla District
 between Malerkotla-Nabha at the southeast of Malerkotla and northwest of Nabha.
 between Malerkotla-Khanna, immediate east of Malerkotla and southwest of Khanna on Malerkotla-Khanna Road.
 between Malerkotla-Ludhiana, immediate north of Malerkotla and south of Ludhiana on Sangrur-Malerkotla-Ludhiana Punjab SH-11.
 Ahmedgarh between Malerkotla-Ludhiana
 Ludhiana District
 Jodhan (southwest of Ludhiana), on Raikot-Jodhan-Ludhiana road.
 Ludhiana (west of), with a new Jodhan-Doraha spur as a south bypass of Ludhiana, at Doraha this spur will connect to the existing NH-5 Ludhiana-Doraha-Ropar-Kharar-Chandigarh airport-Panchkula.
 Mullanpur Dakha, southeast of Ludhiana on NH-5 Firozepur-Moga-Jagraon-Ludhiana-Chandigarh Road. Interconnect with Ludhiana-Bhatinda-Ajmer Expressway.
 between Sidhwan Bet and Ludhiana, east of Ludhiana on Punjab SH-20 Firozepur-Zira-Sidhwan Bet-Ludhiana Road.
 Jalandhar District
 Through tehsils of Phillaur, Nakodar, Jalandhar II.
 Nakodar (east of), between Nakodar-Phagwara.
 Nakodar (northeast of), between Nakodar-Jalandhar on NH-703 Nakodar-Jalandhar Road.
 Nakodar (north of), 2 following separate Y-fork expressways spurs from Nakodar: one to Amritsar-Kartarpur in the west and another to Jammu-Katra in the northwest - one goes to Pathankot-Jammu and another goes to Amritsar.

Nakodar to Amritsar (Spur-1)
First greenfield expressway spur (99 km long) from Nakodar to Amritsar through Sultanpur Lodhi, Goindwal Sahib, Khadur Sahib, Tarn Taran Sahib and ends at Sri Guru Ram Dass Jee International Airport (Amritsar Airport).

Punjab

 Jalandhar District
 Nakodar (north of)
 Kapurthala District
 Sultanpur Lodhi (northeast of), between Sultanpur Lodhi and Kapurthala on NH-703A Firozepur-Sultanpur Lodhi-Kapurthala Road.
 Tehsils of Kapurthala and Bholath
 Tarn Taran District
 Goindwal Sahib (east of), between Goindwal Sahib and Kapurthala on Taran Taran-Goindwal Sahib-Kapurthala Road.
 Khadoor Sahib (east of), Khadur Sahib lies east of Taran Taran and north of Goindwal Sahib
 Tarntaran Sahib
 Amritsar District
 Rakh Manawala (southeast of Amritsar), on Amritsar bypass on AH1 Amritsar-Jalandhar Road.
 New Amritsar (east of Amritsar), on Amritsar bypass on NH-503A Amritsar-Sri Hargobindpur-Hoshiarpur Road.
 Verka (northeast of Amritsar) between Amritsar and Batala on NH54 Amritsar-Batala-Gurdaspur Road. 
 Sri Guru Ram Dass Jee International Airport, with plans to extend a semi-circular loop spur to Dera Baba Nanak near Kartarpur Corridor in the north and then back to this expressway at Gurdaspur in the northeast.

Nakodar to Katra (Spur-2)
Second greenfield expressway spur from Nakodar to Katra passing through Kartarpur, Gurdaspur, and Dinanagar.

Punjab
 Jalandhar district
 Nakodar (north of)
 Kapurthala (east of), between Kapurthala and Jalandar on NH-703A Firozepur-Sultanpour Lodhi-Kapurthala-Jalandhar Road. 
 Kapurthala (northeast of), between Kapurthala and Kartarpur.
 Kapurthala (north of), between Radha Soami Satsang Beas and Kartarpur on AH1 Amritsar-Radha Soami Satsang Beas-Kartarpur-Jalandhar.
 Gurdaspur District
 Sri Hargobindpur (southwest of),  route realignment done at some stretches due to high-pressure "Bathinda-Jammu Gas Pipeline" and "GIGL's CNG Gas Plant" near Mari Buchian.
 Sri Hargobindpur (west of), between Amritsar and Sri Hargobindpur on NH-503A Amritsar-Sri Hargobindpur-Urmar Tanda-Hoshiarpur Road. 
 Gurdaspur (southeast of), between Qadian-Harchowal.
 Gurdaspur (east of), between Gurdaspur and Mukerian on Punjab SH-25 Gurdaspur-Mukerian-Talwara Road.
 Gurdaspur (north of), at Dinanagar between Gurdaspur and Pathankot on NH-54 Gurdaspur-Pathankot Road.
 Pathankot District
 Pathankot (southwest of), at Bhoa.
 Pathankot (west of), at Sunder Chak

Jammu and Kashmir
 Jammu District, bypassing Kathua.
 Jammu
 Reasi District
 Katra (location of Vaishno Devi temple).

Inter-connectivity

Following provide the inter-connectivity:

 Amritsar: 
 Gurdaspur: Amritsar-Gurdaspur NH-54 highway converted to signal-free route.
 Kartarpur Corridor: NH-354 Amritsar-Dera Baba Nanak (Kartarpur Corridor) converted to signal-free route.
 Ludhiana: 
 Chandigarh: NH-5 Ludhiana-Chandigarh Highway via Kharar and Ropar strengthened and widened to 4 lanes, to provide connectivity to Chandigarh airport via Urban Extension Road II. This will reduce Ludhiana-Chandigarh time from 1.5 hours to less than one hour and Chandigarh-Amritsar from 4 hours to 2 hours.
 Bathinda: Ludhiana-Bhatinda-Ajmer Expressway interconnects near Mullanpur Dakha.
 Jind: Trans Haryana Expressway (Ambala-Narnaul) near Pillu Khera. This will reduce the time from Chandigarh Airport to IGI Delhi airport from 5 hours to 2 hours, and Delhi to Manali from 14 hours to 8 hours.

Status updates
 Dec 2017: National Highways Authority of India (NHAI) appointed a consultant to prepare the Detailed Project Report (DPR) within 10 months by Oct 2018.
 Nov 2019: DPR of Delhi-Amritsar-Katra expressway completed by NHAI. Expressway will be around 575 km long, and will cut travel time between Katra and Delhi to 6 hours.
 Jun 2020: Expressway route is finalized. The expressway is added to Amritsar.
 Jun 2020: In Haryana, Section 3D land acquisition notifying process started. In Punjab, notification 3A is in progress. Also, 3A notification for land acquisition of the expressway to Amritsar under Delhi–Amritsar–Katra Expressway is issued, which starts from Kang Sahib Rai village near Nakodar and end at Sri Guru Ram Dass Jee International Airport in Raja Sansi.
 Jul 2020: Survey for land acquisition was under progress in Jammu and Kashmir. Notice 3A is issued.
Dec 2020: In Haryana, land acquisition compensation amount distribution under progress.
 Apr 2021: Construction work awarded by NHAI for all 12 packages on 397.7 Km long Delhi-Nakodar-Gurdaspur section, and 2 out of 3 packages on 99 km long Nakodar-Amritsar section.
Sep 2021: NHAI confirms to complete the expressway by October 2023.
Jan 2022: Prime Minister Narendra Modi will lay the foundation stone for the expressway on 5 January.
Feb 2022: Construction work will start once the foundation stone will be laid, between Bahadurgarh and Sangrur.
Apr 2022: Prime Minister Narendra Modi laid the foundation stone for the expressway.
 work in progress

See also
 Expressways in India
 Amritsar Ring Road
 Amritsar Jamnagar Expressway 
 Expressways & highways in Haryana
 Western Peripheral Expressway
 Eastern Peripheral Expressway
 Trans-Haryana Expressway (Ambala–Narnaul)

References

External links 
 Delhi–Amritsar–Katra Expressway route map and status
 Delhi–Amritsar–Katra Expressway environmental clearance report and route map

National expressways in India
Proposed expressways in India
Transport in Delhi
Transport in Amritsar
Transport in Katra, Jammu and Kashmir
Expressways in Punjab, India